Persona non grata is a 2005 Polish drama film directed by Krzysztof Zanussi.

Cast 
 Zbigniew Zapasiewicz - Wiktor
 Nikita Mikhalkov - Oleg
 Jerzy Stuhr - Polish attaché Radca
 Remo Girone - Italian Consul
 Daniel Olbrychski - Polish vice foreign minister
 Andrzej Chyra - New Consul
 
 Maria Bekker - Oksana
 Jacek Borcuch
 Tadeusz Bradecki
  - Helena Leszczynska

References

External links 

2005 drama films
2005 films
Films scored by Wojciech Kilar
Films shot in Warsaw
Films shot in Moscow
Films shot in Montevideo
Polish drama films
2000s Polish-language films